Tsivoka is a genus of beetles in the family Cerambycidae, containing the following species:

 Tsivoka peyrierasi Villiers, 1982
 Tsivoka simplicicollis (Gahan, 1890)
 Tsivoka testaceipes (Fairmaire, 1889)

References

Dorcasominae